Zhou Wen (Chinese: 周文; 1965 –  Unknown), known as Taxi Demon and Devil, was a Chinese serial killer who killed six women in 2003, while he worked as a taxi driver in the city of Anshan. It is believed his killing spree spawned upon his wife's abortion.

Murders 
Upon getting out of jail for an unrelated crime, Zhou got a job as a taxi driver for the commuters in the city of Anshan in central-southeast Liaoning province. In the summer of 2003, while on the job, Zhou starting his killing spree, strangling female passengers with a rope who had willingly gotten into his taxi, before dumping their bodies in enclosed open ground areas or roadside water wells. Once all the bodies had been located, a moral panic sparked among locals, who resorted to other defaults to avoid the killer, temporarily affecting the transport business.

Arrest 
On November 28, Zhou was detained at his home by authorities, and subsequently confessed after little question. In his confession, he detailed that he hated women following his wife's abortion, which reportedly was without his permission. It was found that Zhou had also written a diary which detailed the murders of all six women.

See also 
 List of serial killers by country
 List of serial killers by number of victims

References 

1965 births
20th-century Chinese criminals
21st-century Chinese criminals
Chinese male criminals
Chinese people convicted of murder
Chinese serial killers
Male serial killers
People convicted of murder by China
People from Anshan
Year of death missing